Lislique is a municipality in the La Unión department of El Salvador. As of 2000, the population was 2,835.

Municipalities of the La Unión Department